Vladimir Anatolyevich Naydanov (born 10 February 1972) is a former Russian professional football player.

Honours
 Russian Third League Zone 6 top scorer: 1994 (19 goals).

External links
 

1972 births
People from Kurgan, Kurgan Oblast
Living people
Soviet footballers
Russian footballers
Association football forwards
Russian Premier League players
FC Tobol Kurgan players
FC Lokomotiv Nizhny Novgorod players
FC Ural Yekaterinburg players
FC Dynamo Bryansk players
FC Chita players
Sportspeople from Kurgan Oblast